Oliver Kurtz (born October 23, 1971) is a former field hockey forward from Germany, who won the gold medal with the Men's National Team at the 1992 Summer Olympics in Barcelona, Spain.  Kurtz was caught for a doping offence in 1987.

References

External links
 
 databaseOlympics

1971 births
Living people
Field hockey players at the 1992 Summer Olympics
German male field hockey players
German field hockey coaches
Olympic field hockey players of Germany
Olympic gold medalists for Germany
German sportspeople in doping cases
Place of birth missing (living people)
Olympic medalists in field hockey
Medalists at the 1992 Summer Olympics
20th-century German people